The Mamquam Icefield is an icefield in southwestern British Columbia, Canada, located at the headwaters of Skookum Creek. It lies at the southern end of Garibaldi Provincial Park and is one of the southernmost icefields in the Pacific Ranges of the Coast Mountains.

See also
List of glaciers in Canada
Mamquam River

References
 

Garibaldi Ranges
Glaciers of the Pacific Ranges
Ice fields of British Columbia